Longfellow is a surname. Notable people with the surname include:

 Alexander Wadsworth Longfellow, Jr. (1854–1934), American architect
 Henry Wadsworth Longfellow (1807–1882), American poet and professor
 Ki Longfellow (born 1944), American writer
 Malvina Longfellow (1889–1962), American stage and silent movie actress
 Richard M. Longfellow (1867–1951), United States Army Private
 Samuel Longfellow (1819–1892), American clergyman and hymn writer
 Stephen Longfellow (1776–1849), member of the United States House of Representatives